Sir Leo Victor de Gale  (28 December 1921 – 23 March 1986) was the first Governor-General of Grenada, from February 7, 1974 to September 30, 1978.

Biography 

Leo de Gale was born in St. Andrew's Parish, near Grenville, Grenada. He served as acting Governor of Grenada for two weeks before it officially achieved independence in February 1974 and he became Governor-General. He retired the year before the 1979 Grenada Revolution.

In the 1960s, Dame Hilda Bynoe who was the incumbent governor of Grenada appointed Leo de Gale as the acting governor of Grenada because she had to take care of some business in a foreign country.

Sir Leo de Gale became the first governor-general during the time of Prime Minister Sir Eric Mathew Gairy. Sir Leo de Gale served from 1974 to 1978. He was then followed by Sir Paul Scoon (1978 to 1992).

Following his political career he took up residence in Bristol, England.

References

1921 births
1986 deaths
Governors-General of Grenada
Knights Grand Cross of the Order of St Michael and St George
Commanders of the Order of the British Empire
Governors of British Grenada
Sir George Williams University alumni
Canadian Army personnel of World War II
Royal Regiment of Canadian Artillery personnel